Lake Wales is a city in Polk County, Florida. The population was 14,225 at the 2010 census. , the population estimated by the U.S. Census Bureau is 16,759. It is part of the Lakeland–Winter Haven Metropolitan Statistical Area. Lake Wales is located in central Florida, west of Lake Kissimmee and east of Tampa.

History

The land around the present city was surveyed in 1879 by Sidney Irving Wailes, who changed the name of a lake, then known as Watts Lake, to Lake Wailes.

The city of Lake Wales was established near the lake in 1911–1912, planned by the Lake Wales Land Company. The spelling Wales was used for the city, although the lake is still generally spelled Lake Wailes. Allen Carleton Nydegger, a Civil Engineer, was contracted by the Lake Wales Land Company to plot out the community of Lake Wales. He and his crew camped on the shores of Crystal Lake and spent months plotting out the new community. In 1925 the Atlantic Coast Line Railroad built a new line from Haines City joining lines to Everglades City. A depot was opened on this line at Lake Wales. The City of Lake Wales was officially incorporated in April 1917.

In 2004, Lake Wales endured the effects of three hurricanes which came through the area: Hurricane Charley, Hurricane Frances and Hurricane Jeanne. The three hurricanes brought hurricane-force winds to the Lake Wales area within a space of 44 days. In 2017, Hurricane Irma brought more hurricane-force winds to Lake Wales.

Geography

The town lies near the geographical center of the Florida peninsula. Lake Wales is located on the Lake Wales Ridge, a sandy upland area running roughly parallel to both coasts in the center of the peninsula.

Lake Wales is located in the humid subtropical zone of the (Köppen climate classification: Cfa). In 2004, the eyes of Hurricane Charley, Hurricane Frances, and Hurricane Jeanne all passed near the town. Virtually all physical damage has been restored.

Climate

Wildlife and environmental lands

Grassy Lake Preserve is a  preserve located behind Janie Howard Wilson Elementary School. Grassy Lake is primarily made up of Lake Wales Ridge scrub land.

Government and politics

Lake Wales, Florida has a commission/manager form of government. Five city commissioners are elected to serve two-year terms. Four of the commission members are elected by the citizens at large but must reside in the district represented by the seat to which they are elected and the other commission member is elected by the citizens at large to serve as mayor and can reside in any district of the city.

In 2016, a Lake Wales police officer, Travis Worley, was accused by a whistleblower on the Lake Wales police force of calling a black suspect the N-word. The department suspended Worley for one day, but denied that he had used a racial slur. In 2019, he was named Lake Wales’ Officer of the Year. The whistleblower said she was subsequently targeted for punishment by the Lakes Wales police department and ultimately resigned. Worley has subsequently been accused on at least two occasions of using the N-word, including once in front of students at the local high school.

Demographics

As of the census of 2010, there were 14,225 people (2014 Estimate put the population at 15,140, according to the U.S. Census Bureau), 5,038 households, and 3,778 families residing in the city. The racial makeup of the city was 65% White, 27.5% African American, 0.50% Native American, 0.8% Asian, 0.10% Pacific Islander, 3.9% from other races, and 2.2% from two or more races. Hispanic or Latino of any race were 15.6% of the population.

There were 5,038 households, out of which 23.8% had children under the age of 18 living with them, 43.1% were married couples living together, 17.4% had a female householder with no husband present, and 34.7% were non-families. 29.3% of all households were made up of individuals, and 14.4% had someone living alone who was 65 years of age or older. The average household size was 2.4 and the average family size was 2.92.

In the city, the population was spread out, with 26.5% under the age of 19, 6.0% from 20 to 24, 20.2% from 25 to 44, 24.2% from 45 to 64, and 23% who were 65 years of age or older. The median age was 42.1 years. For every 100 females, there were 88.7 males. For every 100 females age 18 and over, there were 81.1 males.

The median income for a household in the city was $36,285, and the median income for a family was $47,785. Males had a median income of $33,896 versus $28,631 for females. The per capita income for the city was $16,106. About 20.8% of families and 26.5% of the population were below the poverty line, including 42.1% of those under age 18 and 7.9% of those age 65 or over.

Local attractions

Bok Tower Gardens
Camp Mack's River Resort
Dixie Walesbilt Hotel (also known as the Hotel Walesbilt) 
Spook Hill, an optical illusion which makes a car in neutral appear as if it is traveling uphill (gravity hill)
The commercial historic district in the heart of the old town contains important examples of architecture from the period of the Florida land boom of the 1920s. The district's tallest building, the Walesbilt Hotel, has been boarded up for many years but has been purchased and is in the process of being restored.
The Lake Wales History Museum is a history museum funded by a public-private partnership. It is housed in the old Atlantic Coast Line Railroad Depot (Lake Wales, Florida). It offers exhibits and artifacts from the pre-Columbian era to modern.
Grove House, the visitor's center for the agricultural cooperative Florida's Natural (located across from the company's processing plant).
Chalet Suzanne
The Shrine of Ste Anne des Lacs

Notable people

 Edward Bok, editor at Ladies' Home Journal, died in Lake Wales in 1930 within sight of his beloved Singing Tower
 Pat Borders, 1992 World Series MVP, part-time Lake Wales resident and Lake Wales High School alumnus
 Wade Davis, MLB pitcher for the Colorado Rockies and for 2015 World Series champion Kansas City Royals; born in Lake Wales
 Walt Faulkner, racecar driver, lived in Lake Wales from 1926 to 1936
 Mario Gosselin, NASCAR Camping World Truck Series driver/owner, lives and operates his race shop in Lake Wales
 Red "Galloping Ghost" Grange, iconic player in the College Football Hall of Fame and the NFL, was living in Lake Wales when he died in 1991
 Dominique Jones, NBA player, born and attended high school in Lake Wales
 Amar'e Stoudemire, NBA player, now playing for Hapoel Jerusalem of the Israeli Basketball Premier League and EuroCup, born in Lake Wales
 Robbie Tobeck, center for NFL's Seattle Seahawks; born in Lake Wales

Transportation

  US 27 – This divided highway leads northward to Haines City and Interstate 4 going north, and Frostproof, Sebring, and eventually Miami going south.
  State Road 60 – Also known as Hesperides Road, it leads eastward to Florida's Turnpike and Vero Beach. Westward the highway leads to Bartow and the Tampa Bay region.
  State Road 17 – The Scenic Highway running through the center of town, paralleling US 27 southward to Frostproof and northward to Haines City

Bus service is provided to Winter Haven and Frostproof by Winter Haven Area Transit.

Lake Wales Municipal Airport (FAA LID: X07) is a public-use airport located 2 miles (3.2 km) west of the central business district of the city of Lake Wales in Polk County, Florida, United States. The airport is publicly-owned.

Chalet Suzanne Air Strip This single grass strip four miles north of downtown serves light aircraft arriving at the Chalet Suzanne Inn and Restaurant, a local landmark.

Media

Lake Wales is part of the Tampa/St. Pete television market, the 13th largest in the country and part of the local Lakeland/Winter Haven radio market, which is the 94th largest in the country.

Education

Lake Wales is home to twelve schools, six of which are charter, three of which are traditional public schools and three private schools. Dale R Fair Babson Park Elementary, Hillcrest Elementary, Janie Howard Wilson Elementary, Polk Avenue Elementary and Lake Wales High School were converted to charter status in the Fall of 2004. Edward W. Bok Academy Middle opened in the Fall of 2008 to create a seamless K–12 charter system. McLaughlin Middle School and Fine Arts Academy, Roosevelt Academy Of Leadership And Applied Technology School, and Spook Hill Elementary School are still traditional public schools. Lake Wales Lutheran School, Candlelight Christian Academy, and The Vanguard School are private.

The district is home to 4,675 students: 56.56% White, 31.38% Black, 0.3% Asian, 11.66% Hispanic and 0.11% Native American.

Lake Wales is also home to two colleges, Warner University and Webber International University. The J.D. Alexander Center, a satellite campus of Polk State College is located in downtown Lake Wales in 2009.

References

External links

 City of Lake Wales official site
 Lake Wales Area Chamber of Commerce
 Lake Wales Charter Schools
  Historic Saint Anne Des Lacs ruins

 
Cities in Polk County, Florida
Cities in Florida
1911 establishments in Florida
Populated places established in 1911